Kele Mou Bana is an album by American jazz pianist Don Pullen and the African-Brazilian Connection recorded in 1990 for the Blue Note label.

Reception
The Allmusic review by Michael G. Nastos awarded the album 3½ stars stating "Everything with this band clicks from the word go, as Pullen weaves his way through a panoramic world view that, in this limited CD format, seems like he's merely scratching the surface of what this ensemble is capable of".

Track listing
 "Capoeira" (Guilherme Franco) - 7:00 
 "Listen to the People (Bonnie's Bossanova)" (Don Pullen, Sandra Pullen) - 8:00 
 "Kele Mou Bana" (Mor Thiam) - 11:33 
 "L.V.M./Directo Ad Assunto" (Nilson Matta) - 5:13 
 "Yebino Spring" (Yebga Likoba) - 8:48 
 "Doo-Wop Daze" (Don Pullen) - 11:46 
 "Cimili/Drum Talk" (Thiam) - 3:16 
Recorded in New York City on September 25 & 25, 1990

Personnel
Don Pullen - piano
Carlos Ward - alto saxophone
Nilson Matta - bass
Guilherme Franco - percussion
Mor Thiam - percussions, vocals
Keith and Tameka Pullen - vocals

References

Blue Note Records albums
Don Pullen albums
1991 albums